Chris Mary Francine Whittle (born 23 May 1927) is a Belgian composer, performer (harpsichord and piano) and teacher.

Biography 
Chris Mary Francine Whittle was born in Antwerp, Belgium. Whittle studied music at the Royal Conservatoire in Antwerp, where she won several prizes, including the Albert de Vleeschower prize for composition. Whittle also studied music in France with Alfred Cortot at the Ecole Normale de Musique de Paris. 

Whittle then spent 20 years composing and touring internationally as a pianist in Belgium, France, Germany, Great Britain, Poland and Switzerland. Whittle became interested in the harpsichord, which she studied in Amsterdam with Gustav Leonhardt. She taught at the Wynegem music school in Belgium and gave recitals on harpsichord. Whittle married Luc Jageneau, a harpsichord builder.

Works 
Whittle's compositions were published by Schott-Freres. They include:

Chamber 
 Capriccio, Op. 7 (violin and piano; 1947)
 Sonata (violin and piano; 1951)
 Toccata per Il Cembalo (harpsichord; 1969)
 Trio en Forme de Suite, Op. 24 (trumpet, horn, bassoon; 1955)
 Trio, Op. 11 (violin, cello and piano; 1949)
 Variations for Carillon, Op. 1 (1951)
 Woodwind Quintet (1951; won the Albert de Vleeschower prize)

Orchestra 
 Concerto for Piano (1948)
 Variations on an Old Scottish Song (1952)

Piano 
 24 Preludes, Op. 14 (1952)
 Ballade, Op 15 (1949)
 Berceuse, Op. 4 (1947)
 Diurne, Op. 22 (1965)
 Impromptu, Op. 27 (1966)
 Intermezzi, Op. 32
 Ondine, Op. 12 (1952)
 Scottish Dances, Op. 16 (1951)
 Sonata, Op. 4 (1947)
 Sonata, Op. 9 (1948)
 Sonatine, Op. 30 (1967)
 Two Nocturnes, Op. 6 (1967-68)
 Two Small Pieces, Op. 25 (four hands; 1960)
 Two Suites, Op 1 (1943)

Vocal 
 Christmas Carols, Op. 28 (chorus; 1966)
 Missa brevis, Op. 2 (1944)
 Odelette, Op. 20 (mezzo-soprano, piano and orchestra; 1951)
 Regina Coeli, Op. 17 (chorus; 1950)
 Six Lieder, Op. 23 (1966)

References 

1927 births
Possibly living people
Belgian women composers
Belgian pianists
Living people
Belgian harpsichordists